The Gelonians (or Geloni) (also known as Helonians (or Heloni), are mentioned as a nation in northwestern Scythia by Herodotus.   Herodotus states that they were originally Hellenes who settled among the Budinoi, and that they are bilingual in Greek and the Scythian language.

Their capital was called Gelonos or Helonos, originally a Greek market town. In his account of Scythia, Herodotus writes that the Gelonii were formerly Greeks, having settled away from the coastal emporia among the Budini, where they "use a tongue partly Scythian and partly Greek":

The Budini for their part, being a large and numerous nation, is all mightily blue-eyed and ruddy. And a city among them has been built, a wooden city, and the name of the city is Gelonus. Of its wall then in size each side is of thirty stades and high and all wooden. And their homes are wooden and their shrines. For indeed there is in the very place Greek gods’ shrines adorned in the Greek way with statues, altars and wooden shrines and for triennial  Dionysus festivals in honour of Dionysus...

The fortified settlement of Gelonus was reached by the Persian army of Darius in his assault on Scythia during the 5th century BC, and burned to the ground, the Budini having abandoned it in their flight before the Persian advance. Recent digs at Bilsk in Ukraine's Poltava Oblast have uncovered a vast city identified by the Kharkiv archaeologist Boris Shramko as the Scythian capital Gelonus.  
 
The name according to Herodotus, who took his mythology from "the Greeks who dwell about the Pontos", derives from their eponymous mythical founder, Gelonus brother of Scythes, sons of Heracles, an expression of observed cultural links in genealogical terms. Herodotus also mentions that the Greeks apply the ethnonym both to the actual Gelonians of Greek origin and by extension to the Budinoi.

At the end of the fourth century AD, Claudian in his Against Rufinus (book 1) polemically portrays the tribes of Scythia as prototypical barbarians:
There march against us a mixed horde of Sarmatians and Dacians, the Massagetes who cruelly wound their horses that they may drink their blood, the Alans who break the ice and drink the waters of Maeotis' lake, and the Geloni who tattoo their limbs: these form Rufinus' army.

Sidonius Apollinaris, the cultured Gallo-Roman poet of the fifth century, includes Geloni, "milkers of mares" (equimulgae) among tribal allies participating in the Battle of Chalons against Attila in 451 AD. E.A. Thompson expresses his suspicions about some of these names:

The Bastarnae, Bructeri, Geloni and Neuri had disappeared hundreds of years before the times of the Huns, while the Bellonoti had never existed at all: presumably the learned poet was thinking of the Balloniti, a people invented by Valerius Flaccus nearly four centuries earlier.

See also 
 Gelonians and Mordvins

Notes

References 
 

Ancient Greeks
Scythian tribes
Tribes described primarily by Herodotus